Adam Hamilton Ingram (born 1 May 1951) is a Scottish politician who was a Scottish National Party (SNP) Member of the Scottish Parliament (MSP) from 1999 to 2016. He was first a MSP for the South of Scotland region from 1999 to 2011, then the MSP for the Carrick, Cumnock and Doon Valley constituency from 2011 to 2016.

Early life
Ingram was born on 1 May 1951 in Kilmarnock, Scotland. He was an economist before becoming a parliamentarian, and had been the SNP's national organiser.

Electoral record 
Ingram stood as a candidate in the Carrick, Cumnock and Doon Valley constituency in the first four Scottish Parliament elections. In the first three elections he lost to Labour's Cathy Jamieson but was elected as a list MSP for the South of Scotland region each time in 1999, 2003 and 2007. He was elected to the constituency in the 2011 election with a majority of 2,581 votes over his nearest rival, Richard Leonard, future Leader of the Scottish Labour Party.

Positions held 
Ingram was a shadow deputy minister from 2000 onwards, with responsibility for Children and Early Education from 2004. After the SNP formed a minority government in 2007, Ingram was the Scottish Government's Minister for Children and Early Years until 2011.

External links
MSP website
 
SNP website

1951 births
Living people
People from Kilmarnock
Scottish businesspeople
Scottish economists
Scottish National Party MSPs
Members of the Scottish Parliament 1999–2003
Members of the Scottish Parliament 2003–2007
Members of the Scottish Parliament 2007–2011
Members of the Scottish Parliament 2011–2016